The Portola Valley School is a one-room schoolhouse that sits at 775 Portola Road in Portola Valley, California. It was added to the National Register of Historic Places in 1974. It is currently used for Portola Valley town-hall meetings.

History 
It was designed in 1909 by LeBaron R. Olive and is a rare, surviving example of a school in Mission Revival style. This building was built with wood construction and use of shingles.

Gallery

See also
 National Register of Historic Places listings in San Mateo County, California

References

Buildings and structures in San Mateo County, California
National Register of Historic Places in San Mateo County, California